Tywa is a river in north-western Poland, a tributary of the East Oder river with a length of 47.9 km and catchment area of 264.5 km2. It flows from Lake Myślibórz the Plain Wełtyńską (at Coastland Szczecin), in Western Pomerania.

The river flows from a small lake south of Trzcińsko-Zdrój, flows through eight ribbon lakes (the largest of which is Lake Banská), and the Eastern Oder passes south of Gryfino to dump cooling water channel of power "Dolna Odra ". Larger towns nearby include: Trzcińsko-Zdroj, Strzeszów, Swobnica, Lubanowo, and Tywica.

SNQ reliable flow calculated for the section of the mouth of the river is 0.71 m3/s.

Rivers of Poland
Rivers of West Pomeranian Voivodeship